Dave Fortman (born July 11, 1967) is an American record producer and musician. He is the guitarist for rock band Ugly Kid Joe, and has worked with bands including Superjoint Ritual, Snot, Atomship, Eyehategod, Mudvayne, Otep, Slipknot (on their fourth studio album, titled All Hope Is Gone), and Simple Plan. He also worked on both of Evanescence's multi-platinum selling albums The Open Door and Fallen.

Early years
Fortman was born in Orlando. His mother Marge Ann Singleton Fortman was a kindergarten teacher and his father Jon Richey Fortman a retired biology professor. In Covington, Louisiana he was a trumpet player in marching band for junior high school. He joined with two other musicians John Licali and John McNeely in 1984 to form the band SX while in high school. In 1990 the band relocated to Los Angeles to search for a record deal leading to Dave Fortman joining the band Sugartooth in the same year.

Through Sugartooth's lawyer Dennis Rider who was then Ugly Kid Joe's manager, he met Ugly Kid Joe frontman Whitfield Crane and Guitarist Klaus Eichstadt.

Ugly Kid Joe

Fortman joined Ugly Kid Joe in 1992 and played guitar on their multiplatinum-selling album America's Least Wanted. He also wrote the song "Busy Bee".  Dave played and wrote with Ugly Kid Joe until their demise in 1997 including multiple song writing credits on the albums Menace to Sobriety and Motel California.

After the band reformed in 2011, Dave played guitar and produced their most recent EP Stairway to Hell in 2012 as well as their full length album Uglier Than They Used Ta Be in 2015.

In the summer of 2017 Dave rejoined Ugly Kid Joe on the road for their European tour for the first time since 1997. During the tour he performed with Amy Lee from Evanescence on stage at Graspop in Belgium when she sang "Cats in the Cradle" with the band. He toured with Ugly Kid Joe on their tour of Australia in December 2017 and an 'Americas Least Wanted Anniversary tour' in Europe in April 2018.

Production career
Following the demise of Ugly Kid Joe in 1997, Fortman relocated back to Covington, Louisiana to start a small recording studio with longtime friend Gene Joanen called Balance Studios. Some of his early recording and productions included Phil Anselmo's Superjoint Ritual, Crowbar and Soilent Green. In 2001 Dave recorded a demo for a local band 12 Stones. The demo quickly got recognition and eventually led to a record deal with Wind Up Records. Wind Up hired Jay Baumgardner and Fortman to co-produce their debut album. In 2002 Wind Up's owners Alan and Diana Meltzer hired Fortman to produce Evanescence, a then unknown band from Little Rock, Arkansas.

In March 2003 Evanescence's album Fallen was released and went on to sell 17 million copies worldwide with 4 Grammy nominations including Song of the Year for "Bring Me to Life" and Record of the Year. The album has been certified platinum in 33 countries. In the summer of 2004 Fortman produced Mudvayne's Lost and Found which debuted at number 2 on the billboard charts and sold over 1 million copies. It is the band's most successful album to date. Later that same year he went into the studio with Amy Lee to make the second Evanescence record The Open Door. The album was released in 2006 and debuted at number 1 in the US, Australia, Germany, Greece, and Switzerland and went on to sell more than 7 million copies worldwide.

In late 2007 Fortman was hired to produce Slipknot's All Hope Is Gone which upon its release in 2009 spawned 5 singles including "Snuff" and "Psychosocial". The album went on to sell over 1 million copies in the US and over 2 million worldwide. In late 2009 Fortman was reunited with Ugly Kid Joe drummer Shannon Larkin, now drummer of Godsmack, when he was hired to produce Godsmack's record The Oracle. The Oracle was certified gold in 2011.

He reunited with Godsmack in 2014 for the follow up album 1000 HP as well as producing vocals and mixing Godsmack frontman Sully Erna's solo album entitled Hometown Life in 2016.

Selected discography

References

External links
Official Website

Record producers from Florida
Living people
American rock guitarists
American heavy metal guitarists
American male guitarists
Ugly Kid Joe members
Place of birth missing (living people)
1967 births
20th-century American guitarists
20th-century American male musicians